The Caiyuanba Bridge is an arch bridge which crosses the Yangtze River in Chongqing, China. Completed in 2007, the arch spans  ranking among the longest arch bridges in the world. The bridge carries 6 lanes of traffic and two tracks of Chongqing Rail Transit Line 3 between the Nan'an District south of the Yangtze River and the Yuzhong District to the north.

See also
List of longest arch bridge spans
Yangtze River bridges and tunnels

External links
http://www.china.org.cn/english/photo/230204.htm

References

Bridges in Chongqing
Bridges over the Yangtze River
Arch bridges in China
Bridges completed in 2007
Road-rail bridges in China
2007 establishments in China